Orygma is a European genus of fly from the family Sepsidae.

Species
Orygma luctuosum Meigen, 1830

References

Sepsidae
Diptera of Europe
Taxa named by Johann Wilhelm Meigen
Brachycera genera